Double Vision is an Asian provider of new media content, applications and services. Established in 1985, it has production hubs in Malaysia and Indonesia. Double Vision produces over 1,400 hours of television programming per year in various languages and genres for the regional market. It also houses international entertainment TV network, Channel [V], in its studios.

With in-house production and post-production facilities, Double Vision provides complete end-to-end creative, production and post production services.

FEATURES

SERIES

External links
Double Vision Malaysia's official website

1985 establishments in Malaysia
Mass media companies of Malaysia
Film production companies of Malaysia
Privately held companies of Malaysia